The M1752 Musket was a muzzle-loading firearm invented in 1752 and used by the Spanish Army from then until it was widely replaced by the much more effective Minié rifles during the mid-19th century. The M1752 was the first standardized long gun utilized by the Spanish military and was deployed in Spain's American colonies, where it saw action during the Battle of Havana. Spain also provided around 10,000 up to 12,000 muskets to the American rebels during the Revolutionary War.

Proving typically conventional for the period, the weapon maintained a long service life under the Spanish crown and was deployed to its various frontline forces across the various Spanish holdings. The Model 1752 was in widespread circulation up until the middle of the 1850s by which time more and more fighting forces were adopting more modern Minié ball-long guns (categorized as "rifled muskets").

The M1752 saw some later modifications in 1755 and 1757.

The Model 1752 Musket featured design qualities associated with this period of land-based warfare (in general line infantry)—these were long, heavy guns made primarily with a single-piece wooden stock housing the steel barrel and works of the gun lock. As muzzle-loading weapons, they were loaded down the muzzle end of the gun which necessitated use of a ramrod held in a channel in the stock under the barrel. The stock was affixed to the barrel at multiple points, usually two brass barrel bands and a nose cap at front and which had a ramrod pipe cast to it. The firing mechanism was of the flintlock method requiring a piece of flint to be seated in a vice and cocked rearwards prior to firing. Additional steps included the loading of black powder in the frizzen (pan) as well as gunpowder down the barrel prior to inserting the rest of the ball ammunition consisting of both projectile(s) and cartridge case and which also doubled as wadding. The wooden stock incorporated a straight grip handle that was slightly angled downwards and extended to become the shoulder support (or shoulder stock) which had a butt plate. The Sighting was through fixtures along the top of the weapon. The trigger was set within an oblong ring (trigger guard) under the action as normal. The lock was unique, known as the "Miquelet lock", which reworked some of the accepted design practices of the flintlock—mainly at the mainspring and hammer (or cock). Many were converted from flintlock to percussion cap in the mid-19th century.

Variants

Model 1752 
Original series model; pattern of 1752.

Model 1755 
Modified pattern of 1752
.

Model 1757 
Modified pattern of 1752.

See also
Military history of Spain
List of wars involving Spain
Charleville musket
Brown Bess
Potzdam Musket 1723

External links
http://www.militaryfactory.com/smallarms/detail.asp?smallarms_id=924
https://web.archive.org/web/20120905115103/http://asoac.org/bulletins/91_benninghoff_spanish.pdf

References

Muskets
Weapons of Spain
18th-century weapons